The Stoutsburg Sourland African American Museum (SSAAM) is a history museum located in the Skillman section of Montgomery Township, New Jersey, United States. The museum is located at the Mount Zion African Methodist Episcopal Church, an African Methodist Episcopal church constructed in 1899. The church was added to the National Register of Historic Places on June 7, 2021.

History

Origins 
SSAAM was founded by historians Elaine Buck and Beverly Mills, whose 2018 book If These Stones Could Talk chronicles the history of the African American presence in the Sourland Mountain region of central New Jersey. The museum emerged from a partnership between the Stoutsburg Cemetery Association and the Sourland Conservancy.

Development 
As of December 2021, the museum is still under development as Mt. Zion AME Church undergoes historic restoration work. When open, SSAAM plans to present historical exhibits and other public programming to educate visitors about African American history in New Jersey.

Mt. Zion AME Church

History 
The Mt. Zion AME Church was originally established in 1866 by African American residents, the descendants of both free and enslaved people, of the Sourland Mountain area. The church was originally located in Zion, New Jersey, but was moved to its current location in Skillman in 1899. The church was home to an active congregation until 2005, when it stopped holding worship services.

From the 19th century until the 1930s, the Mt. Zion AME Church organized "camp meetings" each summer to benefit the local community. These events included sermons, singing, and food.

Archaeological investigation 
In December 2020, SSAAM partnered with the Archaeological Society of New Jersey to conduct an archaeological dig at the site of the Mt. Zion AME Church. The investigation uncovered approximately 250 artifacts dating to the late-19th century and 20th century, including window glass, nails and bricks, and ceramics.

Restoration 
SSAAM has been awarded multiple grants to conduct restoration and historic preservation work at the church, including Somerset County Historic Preservation Grants in 2016 and 2021; a 2018 grant from the New Jersey Historic Trust and 1772 Foundation; and a 2019 grant from the Somerset County Open Space, Recreation, Farmland and Historic Preservation Trust Fund.

See also 
 National Register of Historic Places listings in Somerset County, New Jersey

References

External links 
 
 Official Website

Montgomery Township, New Jersey
Museums in Somerset County, New Jersey
History museums in New Jersey
National Register of Historic Places in Somerset County, New Jersey
New Jersey Register of Historic Places